Eric Raymond Rawlin (4 October 1897 – 11 January 1943) was an English first-class cricketer, who played eight matches for Yorkshire County Cricket Club between 1927 and 1936.

Born in Rotherham, Yorkshire, England, Rawlin was a right arm fast medium bowler, who took 21 wickets at 23.71, with a best of 3 for 28 against Lancashire in a Roses Match.  Batting left-handed, he scored 72 runs at 8.00, with a best of 35 against Sussex.

Rawlin died in Rotherham, January 1943, aged 45.

His father, John Rawlin, played 315 matches for Yorkshire, Middlesex and the Marylebone Cricket Club (MCC).

References

External links
Cricinfo Profile

1897 births
1943 deaths
Yorkshire cricketers
Cricketers from Rotherham
English cricketers
English cricketers of 1919 to 1945